is a Japanese actress, tarento, and fashion model who has appeared in a number of feature films and television series. She is represented with Hirata Office. She is nicknamed .

Filmography

TV series

Films

Short films, unreleased films

DVD

Advertisements

Stills

Magazines

Bibliography

Magazines

Notes

References

External links
 
 

Japanese female models
Japanese child actresses
1990 births
Living people
People from Osaka Prefecture
21st-century Japanese actresses